A court cupboard is a type of sideboard with three tiers used to store plates and platters. It was popular in the 16th and first three quarters of the 17th century in Northern Europe.

References

Furniture
Serving and dining